Viva Energy is an Australian company that owns the Geelong Oil Refinery and retails Shell-branded fuels across Australia under a license agreement.  It also owns and retails Liberty Oil and Woodside Petroleum-branded service stations. In total, Viva Energy supplies a network of over 1,330 fuel outlets across Australia. In addition to the Geelong Refinery, it imports fuel supplied by Vitol through 22 import terminals.

In 2023, Viva Energy will also take over the Coles Express retail business, which operates Shell-branded stations which Viva already supplies fuel to.

History
Viva Energy was created in August 2014 when Vitol Investment Partnership acquired Shell's refining and distribution in Australia.  Vitol retained 45% of Viva Energy when it was floated on the Australian Securities Exchange in 2018.

Also in August 2014, Viva Energy purchased a 50% shareholding in Liberty Oil. In February 2019 Viva Energy took full ownership of Liberty. As part of Viva Energy taking full ownership, a new joint venture was established to operate the existing Liberty retail network (Liberty Oil Convenience). The joint venture is 50% owned by Viva Energy (non-controlling) and the other 50% owned by David Wieland and David Goldberger, the founders of Liberty Oil.  Viva will gain rights to fully acquire the joint venture in 2025.

In August 2018, Viva Energy acquired 50% of Westside Petroleum, which operates more than 50 service stations across New South Wales, Victoria and Queensland. In May 2020, it acquired the other 50% of Westside.

In late 2020, Viva Energy agreed to be part of an interim government program commencing on 1 January 2021 to prevent more oil refineries closing, by providing one cent per litre subsidy. At that time, Viva Energy's Geelong refinery was one of four operating in Australia, and all but two (Geelong and Ampol's Lytton Oil Refinery near Brisbane) had been announced to be closing in 2021. To continue to receive the payment past July 2021, Viva Energy must agree to keep the refinery operating for much longer in support of national fuel security. It reported a $95.1 million loss in 2020. The refinery site is proposed to be expanded to include a liquified natural gas import terminal.

Viva Energy had a 35.5% stake in Viva Energy Real Estate Investment Trust (Viva Energy REIT) until it was sold to Charter Hall and Charter Hall Long WALE REIT on 21 February 2020. Viva Energy REIT owns service station and convenience properties. After the sale, Viva Energy REIT changed its name to Waypoint REIT Limited in May 2020.

In September 2022 Viva Energy agreed terms with the Coles Group to purchase the Coles Express retail business. As part of the deal Flybuys will remain a partner and Coles Group will continue stocking its own-branded products. Subject to being granted clearance by the Australian Competition & Consumer Commission and the Foreign Investment Review Board, the transaction is scheduled to be completed in the second half of 2023.

Operations and branding

Viva primarily sells Shell-branded fuel at Shell-branded sites, under a license agreement with Shell plc that expires on 31 December 2029. 710 of these Shell sites are operated by Coles Express, which will also be owned by Viva in 2023.

In addition to the Shell-branded stations, Viva owns and operates Liberty Oil and Woodside Petroleum service stations. The Shell Card used in Australia can be used in all Viva service stations including Liberty and Woodside.

References

Automotive fuel retailers in Australia
Companies based in Melbourne
Companies listed on the Australian Securities Exchange
Energy companies established in 2014
Australian companies established in 2014